Anti is an Estonian masculine given name. It is a cognate of the Finnish masculine given name Antti. As of 1 January 2020, there are 854 men in Estonia named Anti. Anti is the 192nd most popular male name in the country.

Individuals bearing the name Anti include:
Anti Kuus (born 1956), Estonian economist, entrepreneur, photographer and singer-songwriter 
Anti Liiv (born 1946), Estonian psychiatrist, psychologist and politician
Anti Poolamets (born 1971), Estonian historian, lawyer and politician
Anti Saar (born 1980), Estonian children’s writer and translator
Anti Saarepuu (born 1983), Estonian cross-country skier 
Anti Selart (born 1973), Estonian historian
Anti Tammeoks (born 1975), Estonian politician

References

Estonian masculine given names